The Battle of the Persian Gate was a military conflict between a Persian force, commanded by the satrap of Persis, Ariobarzanes, and the invading Hellenic League, commanded by Alexander the Great. In the winter of 330 BC, Ariobarzanes led a last stand of the outnumbered Persian forces at the Persian Gates near Persepolis, holding back the Macedonian army for a month. Alexander eventually found a path to the rear of the Persians from the captured prisoners of war or a local shepherd, defeating the Persians and capturing Persepolis.

Background
The Persian Empire suffered a series of defeats against the Macedonian forces at Granicus (334 BC), Issus/Issos (333 BC) and Gaugamela (331 BC), and by the end of 331 BC Alexander had advanced to Babylon and Susa. A Royal Road connected Susa (the first Persian capital city in Elam) with the more eastern capitals of Persepolis and Pasargadae in Persis, and was the natural avenue for Alexander's continued campaign. Meanwhile, King Darius III was trying to raise a new army at Ecbatana. Ariobarzanes was charged with preventing the Macedonian advance into Persis. He relied heavily on the terrain Alexander needed to pass through. There were only a few possible routes through the Zagros Mountains, all of which were made more hazardous by winter's onset.

After the conquest of Susa, Alexander split the Macedonian army into two parts. Alexander's general, Parmenion, took one half along the Royal Road, and Alexander himself took the route towards Persis. Passing into Persis required traversing the Persian Gates, a narrow mountain pass that lent itself easily to ambush.

During his advance, Alexander subdued the Uxians, a local hill tribe which had demanded the same tribute from him they used to receive from the Persian kings for safe passage. As he passed into the Persian Gates, he met with no resistance. Believing that he would not encounter any more enemy forces during his march, Alexander neglected to send scouts ahead of his vanguard, and thus walked into Ariobarzanes' ambush.

The valley leading up to the Persian Gate, called the Tang'e Meyran, is initially very wide, allowing the Macedonian army to enter the mountains at full march. Ariobarzanes occupied a position near the modern-day village of Cheshmeh Chenar. The road curves to the southeast (to face the rising sun) and narrows considerably at that point, making the terrain particularly treacherous, thus well suited for Ariobarzanes's purposes. According to the historian Arrian, Ariobarzanes had a force of 40,000 infantry and 700 cavalry and faced a Macedonian force of over 10,000.  However, some modern historians have claimed these figures for the Achaemenid force to be grossly exaggerated and implausible. Encyclopædia Iranica suggests a number of defenders of just 700 (or no more than 2,000) men, based on the maximum number of troops likely at Ariobarzanes' disposal, but it notes that most modern historians follow Arrian, Curtius, and Diodorus unreservedly.

Battle

The Persian Gate was only a couple of meters wide at the ambush point. Once the Macedonian army had advanced far enough into the narrow pass,  the Persians rained down boulders on them from the northern slopes. From the southern slope, Persian archers launched their projectiles.  Alexander's army initially suffered heavy casualties, losing entire platoons at a time. The Macedonians attempted to withdraw, but the terrain and their still-advancing rear guard made an orderly retreat impossible. Alexander was forced to leave his dead behind to save the rest of his army—a great mark of disgrace to the Macedonians and to other Greeks, who valued highly the recovery and proper burial of their fallen.

Ariobarzanes had some reason to believe that success here could change the course of the war. Preventing Alexander's passage through the Persian Gates would force the Macedonian army to use other routes to invade Persia proper, all of which would allow Darius more time to field another army and possibly stop the Macedonian invasion altogether.

Ariobarzanes held the pass for a month, but Alexander succeeded in encircling the Persians in a pincer attack with Ptolemy and broke through the Persian defenses. Alexander and his elite contingent then attacked Ariobarzanes from above in a surprise attack until the Persians could no longer block the pass. Accounts of how he did so vary widely. Curtius and Arrian both report that prisoners of war led Alexander through the mountains to the rear of the Persian position, while a token force remained in the Macedonian camp under the command of Craterus.
"[The Persians]...Fought a memorable fight... Unarmed as they were, they seized the armed men in their embrace, and dragging them down to the ground... Stabbed most of them with their own weapons."

Diodorus and Plutarch generally concur with this assessment, although their numbers vary widely. Modern historians W. Heckel and Stein also lend credence to this argument. Although precise figures are unavailable, some historians say that this engagement cost Alexander his greatest losses in his campaign to conquer Persia.

Youtab, the sister of Ariobarzanes, fought  alongside her brother in the battle.

According to some accounts, Ariobarzanes and his surviving companions were trapped, but rather than surrender, they charged straight into the Macedonian lines. One account states that Ariobarzanes was killed in the last charge, while Arrian's version reports that Ariobarzanes escaped to the north, where he finally surrendered to Alexander with his companions. Modern historian J. Prevas maintains that Ariobarzanes and his forces retreated to Persepolis, where they found the city gates closed by Tiridates, a Persian noble and guardian of the royal treasury under Darius III, who had been in secret contact with Alexander the Great. Tiridates considered resisting Alexander's forces to be futile, and so allowed Alexander to massacre Ariobarzanes and his troops right outside the city walls rather than fight.  This is in agreement with Curtius' account which states that the Persian force, after both inflicting and suffering heavy casualties in the ensuing battle, broke through the Macedonian forces and retreated to Persepolis, but were denied entrance into the capital, at which point they returned to fight Alexander's army to the death.

A few historians regard the Battle of the Persian Gate as the most serious challenge to Alexander's conquest of Persia. Michael Wood has called the battle decisive and A. B. Bosworth refers to it as a "complete and decisive victory for Alexander".

Aftermath
Similarities between the battle fought at Thermopylae and the Persian Gates have been recognized by ancient and modern authors. The Persian Gates played the role "of a Persian Thermopylae and like Thermopylae it fell." The Battle of the Persian Gates served as a kind of reversal of the Battle of Thermopylae, fought in Greece in 480 BC in an attempt to hold off the invading Persian forces. Here, on Alexander's campaign to exact revenge for the Persian invasion of Greece, he faced the same situation from the Persians. There are also accounts that an Iranian shepherd led Alexander's forces around the Persian defenses, just as a local Greek showed the Persian forces a secret path around the pass at Thermopylae.

The defeat of Ariobarzanes' forces at the Persian Gate removed the last military obstacle between Alexander and Persepolis. Upon his arrival at the city of Persepolis, Alexander appointed a general named Phrasaortes as successor of Ariobarzanes. Alexander seized the treasury of Persepolis, which at the time held the largest concentration of wealth in the world, and guaranteed himself financial independence from the Greek states.  Four months later, Alexander allowed the troops to loot Persepolis, kill all its men and enslave all its women, perhaps as a way to fulfill the expectations of his army and the Greek citizens, or perhaps as a final act of vengeance towards the Persians. This destruction of the city can be viewed as unusual, as its inhabitants had surrendered without a fight and Alexander had earlier left Persian cities he conquered, such as Susa, relatively untouched. In May 330 BC, Alexander ordered the terrace of Persepolis, including its palaces and royal audience halls, to be burned before he left to find Darius III. Sources disagree as to why he ordered the destruction: it could have been a deliberate act of revenge for the burning of the Acropolis of Athens during the second Persian invasion of Greece, an impulsive, drunken act, or it could have been out of Alexander's supposed anger over not being recognized as the legitimate successor to Darius III.

Notes

References
A. R. Burn, Alexander the Great and the Middle East, Harmondsworth, 1973.
W. Heckel, "Alexander at the Persian Gates", Athenaeum 58, 1980.
J. Prevas, Envy of the Gods: Alexander the Great's Ill-Fated Journey across Asia (USA: Da Capo Press, 2004), .
 Henry Speck, "Alexander at the Persian Gates. A Study in Historiography and Topography" in: American Journal of Ancient History n.s. 1.1 (2002) 15-234
A. Stein, Old Routes of Western Iran, London, 1940.

External links
Ariobarzanes: An Article by Jona Lendering.
Pharnabazus, The Columbia Encyclopedia, Sixth Edition 2006.
King Darius III: A Research Article on Darius-III Codomannus
Gabae: The name of two places in Persia and Sogdiana.
Persian Gates: Photos of the battlefield.
: ARIOBARZANES, Greek form of an Old Iranian proper name AÚrya-bráza

Persian Gate
Persian Gate
330 BC
History of Kohgiluyeh and Boyer-Ahmad Province
History of Fars Province
Persian Gate
Persian Gate